Mahl is an unincorporated community in Nacogdoches County, Texas. It is located on Highway 259 near the City of Nacogdoches.

History
Mahl was founded in the early 1900s during the Gilded age when the Texas and New Orleans Railroad was built.  The town got its name after the last name of a local railroad official, albeit the name backwards.  The post office was built later that year and the local school was founded in 1904, serving nearly 60 students. The time that the town was the most popular was in the mid 1910s, when the town had two stores, the school, saloon, blacksmith, cotton gin, and home to about 100 residents. Then, the two world wars caused the town to decline in residents, and by the 1950s the school and the last few business shut down. In 1990, one household was recorded as a "Mahlite".

Education
The Central Heights Independent School District serves the one household in Mahl.

References

Unincorporated communities in Nacogdoches County, Texas
Unincorporated communities in Texas